Visqueen is Unsane's sixth studio album, released in 2007 through Mike Patton's record label Ipecac Recordings.

Reception

John Bush from AllMusic said that "it had to be questioned whether the band was getting a little too refined for the tastes of its fans", adding that while "the material isn't as powerful as Blood Run, [...] the trio stretches out its sound in spots". Marc Masters from Pitchfork Media said that "the trio's patented sound [...] remains intact, albeit in slicker form. The problem is that this style holds no surprises 18 years after Unsane first coined it."

Track listing
 "Against the Grain" – 4:40
 "Last Man Standing" – 3:34
 "This Stops at the River" – 2:48
 "Only Pain" – 3:33
 "No One" – 2:45
 "Windshield" – 3:58
 "Shooting Clay" – 3:07
 "Line on the Wall" – 3:45
 "Disdain" – 2:37
 "Eat Crow" – 2:33
 "East Broadway" – 8:43

Personnel
Chris Spencer – guitar, vocals
Dave Curran – bass, vocals
Vincent Signorelli – drums

References

Unsane albums
2007 albums
Ipecac Recordings albums